Aleksei Saks (born 20 May 1982 in Tallinn, Estonia) is an Estonian former competitive pair skater. With Diana Rennik, he is the four times Estonian national champion. The two were placed 17th at the 2006 Winter Olympics. Saks previously competed internationally as a single skater on the junior level.

Competitive highlights
(with Rennik)

References

External links
 
 
 
 

1982 births
Living people
Estonian male pair skaters
Figure skaters at the 2006 Winter Olympics
Olympic figure skaters of Estonia
Figure skaters from Tallinn